The SM04 (factory designation 409Da) is a low power, Polish built shunter, formerly operated by PKP (Polish National Railways) and is an improved version of the SM03.

History
Built between 1972 and 1978, the SM04 differed from its predecessor in that its construction allowed for the installation of a more powerful diesel engine, built under licence from Henschel. Originally, this engine was to be the 10H6, which had a power output of 160 bhp; however the 180 bhp 14H6 was used instead.

The SM04 was mainly sold to industry, where they carried their factory designation of 409Da. A mere 2 examples were acquired by PKP at the beginning of the 1990s. Both locomotives had been salvaged from Zakłady Naprawcze Taboru Kolejowego w Sędziszowie (Sędziszów Rolling Stock Reparation Plant), but were removed from PKP's inventory in 2000. One of these is now stationed as an exhibit at the railway museum in Chabówka.

Locomotive assignment

See also
Polish locomotives designation

External links
Modern Locos Gallery
Rail Service
Mikoleje
Chabówka Rail Museum

Railway locomotives introduced in 1972
Diesel locomotives of Poland
B locomotives
Standard gauge locomotives of Poland